Ruliff Grass (August 10, 1921 – March 11, 2006) was a Canadian football player who played for the Toronto Argonauts. He won the Grey Cup with them in 1947. Grass attended the University of Toronto. He later started a construction company.

References

1921 births
Canadian football people from Toronto
Toronto Argonauts players
Players of Canadian football from Ontario
Toronto Varsity Blues football players
2006 deaths